The First Reynolds Ministry was the 5th Ministry of the Government of South Australia, led by Thomas Reynolds. It commenced on 9 May 1860, following Reynolds' defeat of the Hanson Ministry on a confidence vote in the House of Assembly. The ministry was defeated in May 1861, but Reynolds' opponents were unable to form government, and he formed the reconstituted Second Reynolds Ministry on 20 May 1861.

References

Reynolds 1